Looney Tunes Dash was an endless running video game developed and published by Zynga and Eat Sleep Play, under the oversight of John vanSuchtelen. The game was released on December 17, 2014.

Gameplay 
The gameplay is an endless running platform game featuring a number of Looney Tunes characters.

Voice cast
 Jeff Bergman as Bugs Bunny, Daffy Duck, Elmer Fudd, Tweety Bird, Sylvester the Cat, Beaky Buzzard, Tasmanian Devil, Yosemite Sam and Foghorn Leghorn
 Bob Bergen as Porky Pig
 Eric Bauza as Marvin the Martian, Speedy Gonzales, Count Bloodcount and Hugo the Abominable Snowman
 Jim Cummings as Tasmanian Devil (own levels only)
 Lauri Fraser as Granny, Witch Hazel and Miss Prissy
 Paul Julian (archive recordings) as Road Runner
 Wile E. Coyote also appears, but is mute.

Shutdown
Looney Tunes Dash was shut down in 2018. If the game was downloaded before the shutdown, the main menu is still accessible, but the levels aren't.

See also 
 List of Looney Tunes video games

References

2014 video games
Single-player video games
IOS games
3D platform games
Android (operating system) games
Windows Phone games
Endless runner games
Video game sequels
Video games featuring Bugs Bunny
Video games featuring Daffy Duck
Video games featuring Sylvester the Cat
Video games featuring the Tasmanian Devil (Looney Tunes)
Video games developed in the United States
Products and services discontinued in 2018
Cartoon Network video games
Delisted digital-only games
Eat Sleep Play games